The Nordsund Bridge is a bridge that crosses the Nordsundet strait between the islands of Nordlandet and Gomalandet in the town of Kristiansund which is in Kristiansund Municipality, Møre og Romsdal county, Norway. The bridge carries Norwegian National Road 70.

The current bridge replaced an older bridge that was opened on 20 December 1936.

See also
List of bridges in Norway
List of bridges in Norway by length
List of bridges
List of bridges by length
Sørsund Bridge

References

External links
A picture of Kristiansund with both the Nordsund (right) and Sørsund (left) bridges
http://home.no.net/lotsberg/data/norway/bru.html

Bridges in Møre og Romsdal
Bridges completed in 1936
Buildings and structures in Kristiansund
1936 establishments in Norway
Norwegian National Road 70